The following railways operate in the Canadian province of Quebec.

Common freight carriers
Arnaud Railway
Canadian National Railway (CN) including subsidiaries Chaleur Bay Railway (CBC), Matapedia and Gulf Railway (CFMG), and lessor Chemin de fer de la Gaspésie
Canadian Pacific Railway (CP)
Cartier Railway
CSX Transportation (CSXT)
 Charlevoix Railway (CFC)
Chemin de fer Lanaudière (CFL)
Ontario Northland Railway (ONT) through subsidiary Nipissing Central Railway
Ottawa Valley Railway (RLK)
Chemin de fer de l'Outaouais
Quebec Gatineau Railway (QGRY)
Quebec North Shore and Labrador Railway
Roberval and Saguenay Railway (RS)
Rio Tinto Fer et Titane
St. Lawrence and Atlantic Railroad (SLQ)
 Sartigan Railway (CFS)
Tshiuetin Rail Transportation (TSH)
Cartier Railway

Private freight carriers
Port of Montreal railway

Passenger carriers
Amtrak (AMTK)
Via Rail (VIA)
Old Quebec Funicular
Exo (public transit)
Montreal Metro
Tshiuetin Rail Transportation

Defunct railways

Electric
Hull Electric Company
Montreal Island Belt Line Railway
Montreal and Southern Counties Railway
Montreal Terminal Railway
Quebec Railway, Light and Power Company (QL&P, QLP)
Quebec District Railway
Shawinigan Falls Terminal Railway
Quebec Railway Corporation (QRC) through subsidiary Charlevoix Railway
Montreal, Maine and Atlantic Railway (MMA)

Notes

References
Railway Legislation of the Dominion of Canada from 1867 to 1905 Inclusive

 
 
Quebec
Railways